Kunguma Pottu Gounder is a 2001 Indian Tamil-language comedy drama film directed by Suraj (credited as G. Saisuresh) and produced by Vishnuram under Ganga Gowri Productions. The film stars Sathyaraj and Rambha, with Kausalya, Karan, Mouli and Goundamani in supporting roles.

Plot
In desperation to enroll his son in a good school, Kandasamy takes the help of an educated woman to pose as his son's mother. Problems arise when Kandasamy's wife finds it out.

Cast 

Sathyaraj as Kandasamy/Kunguma Pottu Gounder (dual role)
Rambha as Alamelu
Kausalya as Saraswati
Goundamani as Chinnasamy
Karan as Shiva
Ramesh Khanna as Paramasivam
T. S. B. K. Moulee as School principal and Shiva's brother
Vinu Chakravarthy as Alamelu's father
Pandu as Sundaram Pillai
Sindhu as School teacher
Balu Anand as Textile shop owner
Bayilvan Ranganathan as Police inspector
Vichu Viswanath as Lawyer
Master Kaushik as Sakthivel, Kandasamy's son
Master Bharath as young Kandasamy
Suryakanth
Kalidoss
Arulmani
MLA Thangaraj
Omakuchi Narasimhan
Gowthami Vembunathan
Priyanka as Saraswati's friend
Soundar as Munusamy
Lekhasri in a special appearance
Radhika Chaudhari in a special appearance

Production
Kunguma Pottu Gounder was directed by G. Saisuresh who earlier directed Moovendhar (1998) under the name Suraj. The film's story was written by T. K. Maheshwar while Shankar handled the cinematography.

Soundtrack 
The soundtrack was composed by Sirpy.

Reception 
Malathi Rangarajan of The Hindu praised the comic exchanges of Sathyaraj and Goundamani and said, "despite fairly good acting and appealing dialogue the film does not make an impact, it is the pitfalls in the story and screenplay that are to be blamed". Visual Dasan of Kalki gave the film a verdict of "average". Malini Mannath wrote in Chennai Online, "The message that the director intended to convey, about the importance of education and the stringent rules certain prestigious schools follow, is diluted as the director shuttles between the comic and the serious, and gives more importance to the marital discord and the jealous wife story".

References

External links 

2000s Tamil-language films
2001 films
Films scored by Sirpy
Films about the education system in India
Tamil films remade in other languages